Jennifer Caron Hall (born 21 September 1958; also known as Jenny Wilhide) is an English actress, singer-songwriter, artist and journalist.

Early life 
Hall was born in London, the daughter of English director Sir Peter Hall and French actress and dancer Leslie Caron. She has a brother, television producer Christopher Hall, and four half-siblings, including actress Rebecca Hall and director Edward Hall.

Hall was educated at the Lycée Français Charles de Gaulle, Bedales School and Newnham College, Cambridge, where she read English.

Actress 
At the National Theatre in London, Hall played Helena in A Midsummer Night's Dream directed by Bill Bryden in 1982–1983, starring Paul Scofield and Susan Fleetwood as Oberon and Titania. The production was the first production of Shakespeare in the Cottesloe and transferred to the Lyttelton in 1983. While Hall continued to play Helena, Scofield was replaced by Sir Robert Stephens and Brenda Blethyn joined the cast as Hermia

In 1988, Hall played Miranda in The Tempest at the National Theatre directed by her father. This was one of a trio of productions, including The Winter's Tale and Cymbeline, known as "The Late Plays", which Peter Hall directed as his farewell as artistic director of that theatre. After opening in London, they toured the Soviet Union (The Art's Theatre, Moscow, and Tbilisi) and the Globe Theatre in Tokyo, and Epidaurus in Greece before returning to London and transferring to the Olivier at the National Theatre.

In the BBC's 1996 television adaptation of Rumer Godden's The Peacock Spring, Hall played Alix Lamont, a character of half-Indian, half-European descent and narrated the Macmillan Audio Book of it. The production was directed by Christopher Morahan and produced by Glenn Wilhide of ZED and was screened on PBS Masterpiece Theatre in the US in 1997. Also in 1997, she co-starred with Rolf Saxon voicing the leads, George and Nico, in the video game Broken Sword II: The Smoking Mirror. The voiceover actors were directed by her half-brother Edward Hall. She played Princess Betsy in the 1997 film adaptation of Anna Karenina, directed by Bernard Rose.

Musician 
Hall was signed to Warner Bros. Records and as Jennifer Hall released the album Fortune and Men's Eyes in 1987. Her song "Ice Cream Days" appears on the Bright Lights, Big City: Original Motion Picture Soundtrack.

Artist 

In late 2009, Hall began painting on her iPhone and started a blog, The Blue Biro Gallery, where she exhibits some of her work. Her digitally enhanced self-portrait was featured in the Vogue blog.

Hall sketched actors in rehearsal for a touring production of A Winter's Tale, and her sketches of her father's rehearsals for Henry IV part I & II were printed in the 2011 season programmes at Theatre Royal, Bath.

In March 2012, the Theatre Royal in Bath commissioned her to paint a portrait of her father in oils. It was a surprise portrait, for which he did not sit, and about which he knew nothing until the moment he unveiled it at a gala on 25 May 2012 to celebrate the 48 productions he had directed there.

In June 2013, Hall had her first solo show at the Serena Moreton Gallery in Ladbroke Grove.

Journalist and PR 
As a freelance journalist writing under the name Jenny Wilhide, she has been published in titles such as the Evening Standard, The Spectator, the Robb Report and the Telegraph Magazine. Under the editorship of Sarah Sands she wrote a joint column with Tamasin Day-Lewis in the Reader's Digest.

Personal life 
Hall has one daughter from her first marriage. She met her second husband, TV producer and screenwriter Glenn Wilhide, while filming The Peacock Spring in India, and they were married in November 1996.

References

Bibliography
WGBH (1997). Peacock Spring: Program Description. Masterpiece Theatre, 1997.
Mulryne, J.R.; Shewring, Margaret; Barnes, Jason; Mulryne, Ronnie (1999). "The Cottesloe at the National: Infinite Riches in a Little Room" (book). Mulryne & Shewring Ltd, 1999.

External links 

Claude Communications London

1958 births
Living people
Alumni of Newnham College, Cambridge
People educated at Bedales School
English people of American descent
English people of French descent
English stage actresses
English songwriters
English bloggers
20th-century English painters
21st-century English painters
English women singers
British women bloggers
20th-century British women artists
21st-century British women artists
20th-century English women
21st-century English women